Irmgard Trojer (born 16 March 1964) is an Italian former 400 metres hurdler. She won a bronze medal in the 400m hurdles at the 1989 Universiade and competed at the Olympic Games in 1988 and 1992.

Biography
Born in Innichen, Italy, Trojer won three Individual medals at International athletics competitions. She participated at the Olympic Games in 1988 and 1992. In 1988, she was eliminated in the heats, despite being the ninth fastest overall. In 1992, she reached the semifinals. She also reached the semifinals at the IAAF World Championships in Athletics in 1987 and 1991.

Olympic and World results

National titles
Trojer is a nine-time  Italian champion.
6 wins in 400 metres hurdles (1987, 1988, 1989, 1990, 1991, 1992)
1 win in 400 metres (1990)
2 wins in 400 metres indoor (1990, 1992)

See also
 Italian all-time top lists - 400 metres hurdles

References

External links
 

1964 births
Living people
Italian female hurdlers
Olympic athletes of Italy
Athletes (track and field) at the 1988 Summer Olympics
Athletes (track and field) at the 1992 Summer Olympics
World Athletics Championships athletes for Italy
People from Innichen
Mediterranean Games silver medalists for Italy
Mediterranean Games bronze medalists for Italy
Athletes (track and field) at the 1987 Mediterranean Games
Athletes (track and field) at the 1991 Mediterranean Games
Universiade medalists in athletics (track and field)
Mediterranean Games medalists in athletics
Universiade bronze medalists for Italy
Medalists at the 1989 Summer Universiade
Sportspeople from Südtirol